A custom-built or homebuilt computer is a computer assembled from available components, usually commercial off-the-shelf (COTS) components, rather than purchased as a complete system from a computer system supplier, also known as pre-built systems.

A custom-built or homebuilt computer is usually considered cheaper to assemble as compared to buying a pre-built computer, since it excludes the labour cost associated with building the computer. However, depending on the person's budget, build quality, and total cost of parts used, it can still be expensive to build a custom-built computer or equivalent (see Costs of building computers).

Homebuilt computers are almost always used at home, like home computers, but home computers are traditionally purchased already assembled by the manufacturer. However, some suppliers provide both home and homebuilt computers, like the Newbear 77-68, which the owner was expected to assemble and use in his or her home.

History 
Mechanical (non-electric/electronic) computers were built at homes in the Victorian era, beginning with pioneer Charles Babbage in the 1820s. A century later, Konrad Zuse built his own machine when electromechanical relay technology was widely available. In 1965, electronics engineer James Sutherland started building a computer out of surplus parts from his job at Westinghouse. The hobby then took off with the early development of microprocessors, and since then, many enthusiasts have constructed their own computers.

Early examples include the Altair 8800 from the United States and the later British Newbear 77-68 and Nascom designs from the late 70's and early 80's. Some were made from kits of components, or simply distributed as board designs like the Ferguson Big Board. The Altair 8800 pioneered the S-100 bus which somewhat simplified the process.

Ultimately, the development of home computers, the IBM PC (and its derivatives and clones), and the industry of specialized component suppliers that grew up around this market in the mid 80's have made building computers much easier. Computer building is no longer limited to specialists.

Computers based on Apple Macintosh and Amiga computer platforms often can not be built in general by users legally because of patents and licenses for their hardware, firmware, and software.

Development as a hobby 

Building desktop PCs has become a popular hobby for most people, especially for those who play video games (known as "gamers"). Not only they can build a desktop that can outperform other pre-built models selling in retail stores, but those building their own computer may add whatever components they want, ranging from multiple hard drives, case mods, high-performance graphics cards, liquid cooling, multi-head high-resolution monitor configurations, or using alternative operating systems without paying the so-called "Microsoft tax", such as Linux.

As prices for components have increased over time, it became less cost-effective for most users to build their own computers. On the other hand, pre-built computers continue to improve in quality and performance, with manufacturers offering more options to their computers. The growing popularity of laptops and tablets leads to a mobile first design methodology that is difficult for home builders to duplicate economically. Despite this, some passionate computer users continue to build their own PCs to enjoy the benefit of having more control over their own machines.

With the rise of virtual reality headsets (VR) such as the HTC Vive, the demand for high performance computing has risen. Competitive games with their own dedicated tournaments have brought about more builders due to the more effective customization in performance.

Standardization 
Practically all PCs and some laptops are built from readily interchangeable standard parts. Even in the more specialized laptop market, a considerable degree of standardization exists in the basic design, although it may not be easily accessible to end-users. Although motherboards are specialized to work only with either Intel or AMD processors, all other parts like Graphic processors, RAM, Chassis/Computer cases have been standardized to fit any setup. The availability of standard PC components has led to the development of small scale custom PC assembly. So-called white box PC manufacturers and commercial "build to order" services range in size from small local supply operations to large international operations.

Kits and barebones systems 
Computer kits include all of the hardware (and sometimes the operating system software, as well) needed to build a complete computer. Because the components are pre-selected by the vendor, the planning and design stages of the computer-building project are eliminated, and the builder's experience will consist solely of assembling the computer and installing the operating system. The kit supplier should also have tested the components to assure that they are compatible.

A barebones computer is a variation on the kit concept. A barebones system typically consists of a computer case with a power supply, motherboard, processor, and processor cooler. A wide variety of other combinations are also possible: some barebones systems come with just the case and the motherboard, while other systems are virtually complete. In either case, the purchaser will need to obtain and install whatever parts are not included in the barebones kit (typically the hard drive, Random Access Memory, peripheral devices, and operating system).

Like mass-produced computers, barebones systems and computer kits are often targeted to particular types of users, and even different age groups. Because many home computer builders are gamers, for example, and because gamers are often young people, barebones computers marketed as "gaming systems" often include features such as neon lights and brightly coloured cases, as well as features more directly related to performance such as a fast processor, a generous amount of RAM, and a powerful video card. Other kits and barebones systems may be specifically marketed to users of a free software operating system such as Linux or one of the BSD variants, with components guaranteed for compatibility and performance with that operating system.

Scavenged and "cannibalized" systems 
Many amateur-built computers are built primarily from used or "spare" parts. These types of computers are built from numerous components that were taken from other computers that are otherwise broken, outdated, and/or no longer being used. It is sometimes necessary to build a computer that will run an obsolete operating system (such as Windows 98) or other proprietary software for which updates are no longer available and will not run properly on a current platform.

Economic reasons may also be a factor for an individual to build a new computer from used parts, especially among young people (including teenagers) or in developing countries where the cost of new equipment places it out of reach for the average people.

Advantages and disadvantages

Advantages 
There are several benefits and advantages to building one's own computer compared to purchasing a mass-produced model:

Personal preference 
Homebuilt computers are often customized to suit the user's needs in regards to quality, price, and availability.

Recycling computers, components, and upgrading 
Homebuilt computers can also be made to recycle an older computer, or to upgrade internal components such as the motherboard, CPU, video card, etc.

High-end computing 
Homebuilt computers can be made to build high-end computers using only top-quality parts for gaming, multimedia, or other demanding tasks.

Removal of shovelware 
Homebuilt computers avoid trial software and other commission-driven additions that are usually made to mass-market computers before they are shipped to end-users.

Use of standardized parts and upgrading 
Homebuilt computers ensure the use of industry-standard parts for operating system compatibility or to upgrade the original build at a later date with little hassle.

Separate OS and driver discs 
Homebuilt computers ensure that one has all the individual driver and OS discs, provided if the user can source them. Many manufactured computers usually come with one or two discs — one containing the OS, and another containing the drivers required, plus all the shovelware that was initially installed.

Educational value and experience 
Homebuilt computers offer enjoyment, personal satisfaction, and educational experience.

Use of high-quality parts 
Homebuilt computers tend to use higher-quality parts from third-parties, as OEMs tend to use cheaper, lower quality parts in order to keep the prices of their prebuilt computers low and affordable.

Cheaper to build 
In most cases, building a computer themselves is much cheaper than buying a prebuilt one, when they compare the specifications.

Disadvantages 
Despite the aforementioned benefits, however, there are some drawbacks and compromises into building one's own computer:

Poorly-designed systems and cases 
A poorly designed system and/or case may have several flaws that would be exposed during a manufacturer's testing. For instance, choosing a case solely on the basis of looks may have poor ventilation if the CPU is overclocked. For this reason, it is recommended to use a case that favors better airflow with the system over the aesthetics.

Knowledge requirements based on computer hardware and education 
Assembling a homebuilt computer requires the user to be skilled and have some basic knowledge and education of computer hardware before building a computer, such as how all the components work and how they interact. Things like air flow, compatibility of each component with other components, space constraints inside the computer case, PCIe lanes and slots are some of the most important points for people to educate themselves on before building a computer. Studying a guide on building and buying computer components is also advised.

Additionally, for the same reason, finding certain components and knowing whether or not certain components are compatible are not possible without prior knowledge of computer components and the like.

Lack of technical support 
The lack of technical support and warranty protection other than what may be provided by the individual component and software vendors. However, a person assembling a computer likely has the expertise to maintain the system (with the basic knowledge of computer hardware and the skills to build one, of course), and would require little assistance from manufacturers.

Costs of building computers 
Assembling one's own computer (especially for white boxes) is usually more expensive than buying a pre-built one from a manufacturer, especially if the build costs more than what the person has due to the build quality and the total amount of the parts used. For this reason, it is better to just buy a pre-assembled computer from a well-known manufacturer or brand name rather than just have people build it themselves (unless one has the talent, skills, budget, and the knowledge to do so).

Custom-built computers and alternative operating systems 

Because almost all mass-manufactured PCs ship with some version of Microsoft Windows pre-installed, individuals who wish to use operating systems other than Windows (for example, Linux or BSD) often choose to build their own computers. Their reason for doing so is not always related to saving money on an operating system.

Because Microsoft Windows is the de facto standard operating system for PCs, hardware device drivers of different qualities can readily be found that will enable virtually any component designed for the PC architecture to function on a Windows platform. However, the same isn't true for alternative operating systems like Linux and BSD, so these system users have to be careful to avoid hardware that is incompatible with their choice of operating system. Even among hardware devices that technically will "work" with these alternative operating systems, some will work better than others. Therefore, many users of non-Microsoft operating systems choose to build their own computers from components known to work particularly well with their preferred platforms.

A less common but still relevant option for people who choose to go another route when building their own PC and choosing their operating system may choose to configure what is called a Hackintosh system. This means that the user of the computer builds the computer specifically with the macOS operating system in mind. This is generally not a recommended route, as Apple has strict standards of what hardware they choose works with their software or not. It is often a very tedious process to installing macOS in a non-Macintosh system, but this hasn't stopped curious enthusiasts from achieving success. Following previously built systems that worked is very important for success in this area.

Custom-built computers and high-performance systems 
Most mainstream manufactured computers use common or inexpensive parts such as onboard graphics and audio. While integrated accessories offer dramatic economic savings (and satisfy many users), these options generally do not perform as well as dedicated hardware under high demand situations such as current games, CAD and media production.

Homebuilt computers are most common among gamers, engineers, or other people who demand more performance from a specific component than the average user. An example would be a gamer using a slightly behind-the-curve CPU and disk drive, spending the difference on a more capable dedicated graphics card.

Additionally, those with more specific computer needs usually appreciate being able to upgrade certain components to fit their needs and the evolving needs of the software being used; in a typical manufactured PC the support components (such as power supply unit, motherboard, or even the chassis) are unfit for accepting high-performance add-in components. Constructing a system with future expansion in mind allows for such upgrades, which in turn are much cheaper than buying a brand new computer every time individual components become obsolete or insufficient to meet the needs of the user.

High-end PCs most often fall in the realm of heavy processor and/or memory usage applications such as a multimedia PC, home theater PC, music production, engineering, and many more. Generally a high-end system is capable of meeting the demands of gaming and can be used as such. A major difference between a high-end PC and a gaming PC is likely to only be the choice in video card since they will share a majority of other components. While a general-purpose high-end computer may be put to use in a render farm or as a file server, and be provisioned with components targeted at this use (such as a fast GPU for rendering or high-performance storage for serving files), most gaming takes place in real time so with a gaming PC all the components matter in creating a flawless and seamless experience. A less-intensive type of build satisfies or exceeds the needs of most computer users.

See also 
 White box (computer hardware)
 Hackintosh
 Barebone computer
 Enthusiast computing
 Future-proofing

References

External links

Personal computers
DIY culture